Señorita Panamá 1994, the 12th Señorita Panamá pageant, was held in Teatro Anayansi Centro de Convenciones Atlapa, on September 3, 1994, after weeks of events. The pageant was broadcast on September 12 through RPC Panamá. 16 contestants from all over the country competed for the prestigious crown. At the conclusion of the final night of competition, outgoing titleholder Maria Sofia Velazquez crowned Michelle Sage Navarrete as the new Señorita Panamá.

Final result

Contestants 
These are the competitors who have been selected this year.

References

External links
  Señorita Panamá official website
 

Señorita Panamá
1994 beauty pageants